Lecanopteris mirabilis is a species of tropical fern in the genus Lecanopteris native to Papua New Guinea and Sulawesi. An epiphyte, its name means "wonderful" or "marvelous". This rhizome forms a shelter for ants, making this a myrmecophyte, though unlike others of its genus the rhizome is flattened and doesn't contain hollow galleries.

References

mirabilis
Plants described in 1929
Plants described in 1825
Plants described in 1920